Úherčice is a municipality and village in Chrudim District in the Pardubice Region of the Czech Republic. It has about 100 inhabitants.

History
The first written mention of Úherčice is from 1392.

References

External links

Villages in Chrudim District